The 2010 League of Ireland Cup, also known as the 2010 EA Sports Cup, was the 37th season of the League of Ireland  knockout competition.

The competition was won by Sligo Rovers who defeated Monaghan United in the final on 25 September 2010 at the Sligo Showgrounds.

A total of 29 teams competed in the 2010 competition. The ten Premier Division, twelve First Division clubs were joined by five A Championship teams plus Letterkenny Rovers, the 2009 Ulster Senior League champions, and the Kerry District League representative side. For the Preliminary, First and Second Rounds of the competition, all participating clubs were split into 4 regional pools with the further rounds of the competition having an open draw. Bohemians, Shamrock Rovers, Dundalk and Sporting Fingal all received automatic byes into the Second Round of the competition due to each club's European football participation. The 2010 competition commenced with the Preliminary Round in March 2010.

Preliminary round

The draw for the Preliminary round took place on 11 March 2010. Fixtures were played on 23, 29 and 30 March 2010.

Pool 2

Pool 3

Pool 4

First round

The draw for the First round took place on 11 March 2010. Fixtures were played on Monday 12 and Tuesday 13 April 2010.

Pool 1

Pool 2

Pool 3

Pool 4

Second round

The draw for the Second round took place on 11 March 2010. Fixtures were played on Monday 10 and Tuesday 11 May 2010.

Pool 1

Pool 2

Pool 3

Pool 4

Quarter-finals

The draw for the quarter-finals took place on 12 May 2010. Fixtures were played on Tuesday 1 June 2010.

Semi-finals

The draw for the semi-finals took place on 2 June 2010. Fixtures were played on 17 August 2010.

Final

References

External links
 Official website

3
Cup
League of Ireland Cup seasons